Pinar del Rey is a public park in San Roque, Cádiz in the south of Spain, with mainly pine trees. The Alhaja stream runs through the park.

History

It was king Ferdinand IV of Castile who donated this area to the City of Gibraltar in 1310.

The forest dates back to 1800 when the Spanish Navy planted pine trees here to supply timber to build warships. The trees were never cut down as the combined Spanish and French fleet were defeated in the Battle of Trafalgar in 1805.

References

Parks in Spain
Protected areas of Andalusia